Haselmere is a surname. Notable people with the surname include:

John Haselmere, English politician, ancestor of Thomas
Teddy Haselmere (1895–1983), English rugby union player
Thomas Haselmere (fl. 1414), English politician